The foramen lacerum is a triangular hole in the base of skull. It is located between the sphenoid bone, the apex of the petrous part of the temporal bone, and the basilar part of the occipital bone.

Structure 
The foramen lacerum is a triangular hole in the base of skull. It is located between 3 bones:

 the sphenoid bone, forming the anterior border.

 the apex of petrous part of the temporal bone, forming the posterolateral border.
 the basilar part of occipital bone, forming the posteromedial border.

It is the junction point of 3 sutures of the skull:

 the petroclival (petrooccipital) suture.
 the sphenopetrosal suture.
 the sphenooccipital suture.
It is situated anteromedial to the carotid canal.

Development 
The foramen lacerum fills with cartilage after birth.

Function 
The foramen lacerum transmits many structures, including:

 the artery of the pterygoid canal.
 the recurrent artery of the foramen lacerum, which supplies the internal carotid plexus.
 the nerve of pterygoid canal.
 some venous drainage, which connects the extracranial pterygoid plexus with the intracranial cavernous sinus and present an unopposed route for infection.
 the greater petrosal nerve and the deep petrosal nerve, which merge to form the nerve of the pterygoid canal (the deep petrosal nerve carries sympathetic, the greater petrosal nerve carries parasympathetic fibers of the autonomic nervous system to blood vessels, mucous membranes, salivary glands, and lacrimal glands).
 one of the terminal branches of the ascending pharyngeal artery (itself a branch of the external carotid artery), which is one of three possible "meningeal branches" of this vessel.

The internal carotid artery passes from the carotid canal in the base of the skull, emerging and coursing superior to foramen lacerum as it exits the carotid canal. The internal carotid artery does not travel through foramen lacerum. The segment of the internal carotid artery that travels above foramen lacerum is called the lacerum segment.

Clinical significance 
The foramen lacerum has been described as a portal of entry into the cranium for tumours, including nasopharyngeal carcinoma, juvenile angiofibroma, adenoid cystic carcinoma, malignant melanoma, and lymphoma.

History 
The first recorded mention of the foramen lacerum was by anatomist Wenzel Gruber in 1869. Study of the foramen has been neglected for many years because of the small role it plays in intracranial surgery.

Additional images

References

External links 
  - "Internal view of skull."
 Photo of model at Waynesburg College skeleton/foramenlacerum
 
 
 Image at ucsd.edu 

Foramina of the skull